Themisto , also known as , is a small prograde irregular satellite of Jupiter. It was discovered in 1975, subsequently lost, and rediscovered in 2000.

Discovery and naming 

Themisto was first discovered by Charles T. Kowal and Elizabeth Roemer on 30 September 1975, reported on 3 October 1975, and designated . However, not enough observations were made to establish an orbit and it was subsequently lost. 

Themisto appeared as a footnote in astronomy textbooks into the 1980s. Then, in 2000, a seemingly new satellite was discovered by Scott S. Sheppard, David C. Jewitt, Yanga R. Fernández and Eugene A. Magnier, and was designated . It was soon confirmed that this was the same as the one observed in 1975. This observation was immediately correlated with an observation on 6 August 2000, by the team of Brett J. Gladman, John J. Kavelaars, Jean-Marc Petit, Hans Scholl, Matthew J. Holman, Brian G. Marsden, Philip D. Nicholson and Joseph A. Burns, which was reported to the Minor Planet Center but not published as an IAU Circular (IAUC).

In October 2002 it was officially named after Themisto, daughter of the river god Inachus and lover of Zeus (Jupiter) in Greek mythology.

Characteristics 

Themisto's orbit is unusual: unlike most of Jupiter's moons, which orbit in distinct groups, Themisto orbits alone.  The moon is located midway between the Galilean moons and the first group of prograde irregular moons, called the Himalia group.

Themisto is about 8 kilometers (5 miles) in diameter (assuming an albedo of 0.04). While its true albedo could not be measured by NEOWISE due to poor timing of observations, it is known to have color index B−V=0.83, V−R=0.46, and V−I=0.94.

References

External links 
 David Jewitt's pages
 Jupiter's Known Satellites  (by Scott S. Sheppard)

Moons of Jupiter
Irregular satellites
Discoveries by Charles T. Kowal
Discoveries by Elizabeth P. Roemer
Discoveries by Scott S. Sheppard
Discoveries by David C. Jewitt
Discoveries by Yanga R. Fernandez
Discoveries by Eugene A. Magnier
19750930
20001121
Moons with a prograde orbit